The AWP Small Press Publisher Award is an annual prize given each year since 2013 to nonprofit presses and literary journals that recognize the labor, creativity, resourcefulness, and innovation of small publishers. The award is given to a publisher of books in odd years and to a journal in even years.

2020: Birmingham Poetry Review
Ecotone
Terrain.org

2019: Zephyr Press
Green Writers Press
Split Lip Press

2018: Creative Nonfiction
Fence
The Normal School
Terrain.org

2017: Coffee House Press
Belladonna
CavanKerry Press

2016: Guernica
Beloit Poetry Journal
Creative Nonfiction

2015: Graywolf Press
Bellevue Literary Press
Coffee House Press
Etruscan Press
Salmon Poetry

2014: One Story, Inc.
The Cincinnati Review
Creative Nonfiction

2013: Sarabande Books
Bellevue Literary Press
Coffee House Press
Red Hen Press

References

External links 
 AWP Small Press Publisher Award website

21st-century literary awards